The Division of Forde is an Australian Electoral Division in Queensland.

Geography
Since 1984, federal electoral division boundaries in Australia have been determined at redistributions by a redistribution committee appointed by the Australian Electoral Commission. Redistributions occur for the boundaries of divisions in a particular state, and they occur every seven years, or sooner if a state's representation entitlement changes or when divisions of a state are malapportioned.

History

The division was created in 1984 and is named after Frank Forde, who was Prime Minister of Australia for seven days in 1945 following the death of John Curtin. When it was created it was a marginal seat in the southern suburbs of Brisbane, but it now has no territory in common with the original seat and is located in exurban and semi-rural areas south of the city, including Beenleigh and Loganlea.

It was a fairly safe seat for the Liberal Party after the 2004 election.  Kay Elson announced that she would not re-contest her seat in the 2007 election. Wendy Creighton, a Boonah resident and editor of the local newspaper, the Fassifern Guardian, contested Forde as the Liberal candidate instead. She was defeated at the Federal election by Brett Raguse, the opposing Labor Party candidate, making Forde the safest Liberal Party seat to be claimed by the Labor Party at the 2007 election. The seat returned to the LNP with Bert van Manen in 2010.  Incumbent van Manen then held on to the seat during the 2013, 2016 & 2019 elections.

Ahead of the 2016 federal election, ABC psephologist Antony Green listed the seat in his election guide as one of eleven which he classed as "bellwether" electorates. Roy Morgan Research found the Division of Forde to be the least politically involved electorate in Australia, with only 7% of voters interested in political analysis as a type of media content.

Members

Election results

References

External links
 Division of Forde (Qld) — Australian Electoral Commission

Electoral divisions of Australia
Constituencies established in 1984
1984 establishments in Australia